Black virgin mountain can refer to:

Black virgin mountain - A famous mountain in Vietnam
Black virgin mountain: A return to Vietnam a book by Larry Heinemann
 - Total pages: 243